Mas que Amor... Frenesi (More than Love... Frenzy) is a 2001 Venezuelan telenovela that was produced by and aired on Venevisión. It had a total of 105 episodes and was distributed internationally.

Synopsis

Mas que Amor... Frenesi tells the story about characters that we might find anywhere, in a supermarket, in a shopping center in Caracas, just about anywhere in any city. This group of adults who love each other with a frenzy and for that reason their relationships become too complex for them to love each other. Their daily lives, their struggles to achieve their dreams drive the plot to the point where it elicits audience laughter... or tears. There are several love stories – different, complex, sweet, some not so fortunate, lived and suffered by people who in spite of their pain never stop seeing a new day as a new opportunity in their lives, and things will work out.

Cast
Wanda D' Isidoro as Virginia Fajardo
Mario Cimarro as Santiago Guerrero
Jean Carlo Simancas as Orestes Lara
Carolina Perpetuo as Mercedes Fajardo de Lopez
Denise Novell as Consuelo "Chelo" Pacheco
Gigi Zancheta as Hada Marina Fajardo de Pimentel
Rafael Romero as Abelardo Pimentel
Ana Karina Casanova as Carmela Crespo
Yanis Chimaras as Pompeyo Lopez
Raul Amundaray as Tadeo Guerrero
Margarita Ortega as Maria Patricia Mendoza
Isabel Moreno as Corazon
Herminia Martinez as Perpetua de Fajardo
Elizabeth Morales as Socorro Angulo
Cristina Obin as La Gran Betancourt
Martha Carbillo as Justina
Jose Torres as Pio
Pedro Lander as Marco Tulio Bracamonte
Ramon Hinojosa as Tapia
Rolando Padilla as Preston Echevarria
Victor Rentroya as Norton
Johanna Morales as Nubis Mayo
Adelaida Mora as Belinda
Reinaldo Jose Perez as Casto Manuel
Maritza Bustamante as Maria Fernanda Lopez Fajardo
Daniel Elbitar as Alberto Jose "Tito" Rodriguez Pacheco
Deyalith Lopez as Jennifer
Victor Hernandez as Serafín
Candy Montesinos as Ana
Cesar Roman Bolivar as Pablo
Kimberly Dos Ramos as Anastasia "Taty" Lara Fajardo
Lenin Dos Ramos as Rodrigo Pimentel Fajardo
Cindy Carol Da Silva as Alejandra Pimentel Fajardo
Jose Manuel Moreno Suarez as Fernando Jose "Nandito" Lopez Pacheco
Rocio Bastidas as Rafaela
Jenny Valdez as Xiolimar
Mario Brito as Chicho
Monica Pereda as Samira
Frank Mendez as Camacaro
Juan Galeno as Jacinto
Maritza Adames as Lopez
Jean Paul Leroux as Chacon
Ana Massimo as Clarita
Carmen Francia as Clemencia
Asdrubal Blanco as Edisson
Juan Frankis as Anselmo Lander/Carterito
Vicente Tepedino as Teodoro
Chony Fuentes as Pepita Pacheco

See also
List of famous telenovelas
List of programs broadcast by Venevision

References

External links
Mas que Amor... Frenesi at the Internet Movie Database

2001 telenovelas
2001 Venezuelan television series debuts
2001 Venezuelan television series endings
Television shows set in Caracas
Venevisión telenovelas
Venezuelan telenovelas
Spanish-language telenovelas